Ferdinand Preindl (born 25 February 1912, date of death unknown) was an Austrian speed skater. He competed at the 1936 Winter Olympics and the 1948 Winter Olympics.

References

1912 births
Year of death missing
Austrian male speed skaters
Olympic speed skaters of Austria
Speed skaters at the 1936 Winter Olympics
Speed skaters at the 1948 Winter Olympics
Sportspeople from Innsbruck